Robert Earl Holmes (October 5, 1945 – April 14, 2018) was an American football running back who played collegiately at Southern University and professionally in the American Football League for the Kansas City Chiefs, and in the National Football League for the Chiefs, the Houston Oilers, and the San Diego Chargers. He was an AFL All-Star in 1969, and played with the Chiefs in their defeat of the Oakland Raiders in the 1969 AFL Championship Game and in their crushing of the NFL's champion Minnesota Vikings in the fourth and final AFL-NFL World Championship Game.  He joined the Saskatchewan Roughriders of the Canadian Football League during the 1976 season, playing 5 regular season games and the Western Final. Several years later he returned to Regina to live. He died on April 14, 2018.

See also
 Other American Football League players

References

External links
NFL.com player page

1945 births
2018 deaths
20th-century African-American sportspeople
African-American players of American football
People from Huntsville, Texas
Players of American football from Texas
American football running backs
Southern Jaguars football players
Kansas City Chiefs players
Houston Oilers players
San Diego Chargers players
American Football League All-Star players
American Football League players